James Christopher "J. C." Barnes is an American criminologist and associate professor at the University of Cincinnati's School of Criminal Justice.

He is known for studying biosocial criminology and the potential links between genetics and crime. He also has interests in studying human decision-making.

References

External links
Faculty page

Living people
Florida State University alumni
University of Cincinnati faculty
American criminologists
Year of birth missing (living people)